HMS Pompee was a 74-gun ship of the line of the British Royal Navy. Built as Pompée, a  ship of the French Navy, she was handed over to the British at Spithead by French royalists who had fled France after the Siege of Toulon (September–December 1793) by the French Republic, only a few months after being completed. After reaching Great Britain, Pompée was registered and recommissioned as HMS Pompee and spent the entirety of her active career with the Royal Navy until she was broken up in 1817.

Service
During the Siege of Toulon, Captain Poulain, her commanding officer, joined the British. Pompée fled Toulon when the city fell to the French Republicans and sailed to Britain under the temporary command of Lieutenant John Davie.  She arrived at Portsmouth on 3 May 1794, and was registered on the navy list under an Admiralty order dated 29 October 1794.

Pompée was recommissioned as HMS Pompee under her first commanding officer, Captain Charles Edmund Nugent, in May 1795 and entered service with the Channel Fleet after a period of refitting. The ship retained its original French spelling of the Pompey name and not the anglicised form. From August 1795 she was under Captain James Vashon, and she was later one of the ships involved in the Spithead mutiny in 1797.

, Pompee, and  shared in the proceeds of the capture on 10 September of Tordenshiold.

Under Captain Charles Stirling, she fought at the Battle of Algeciras Bay in 1801. In 1807 the ship, under the command of Captain Richard Dacres served in the Mediterranean squadron under Rear-Admiral Sir Sydney Smith, as part of the Vice-Admiral Duckworth's Dardanelles Operation and later the Alexandria expedition of 1807.

Pompee was on her way to Barbados on 20 October 1808 when she encountered Pylade. After a chase of 18 hours, Pompee was able to catch Pylade, which struck. Pilade was under the command of lieutenant de vaisseau Cocherel. She was eight days out of Martinique but had not made any captures. Captain George Cockburn of Pompee described Pylade as "only Three Years old, in perfect good State, and in every Respect fit for His Majesty's Service." Her officers had also told him that she was "the fastest sailing Vessel the French had in these Seas."

This money was paid in June 1829.

Pompee participated in the capture of Martinique in January 1809. Later, she and  took part in an action on 17 April 1809.

In April 1809, a strong French squadron arrived at the Îles des Saintes, south of Guadeloupe. Pompee was among the naval vessels that shared in the proceeds of the capture of the islands.

Fate
Pompee was fitted out for service as a prison hulk between September 1810 and January 1811. She was finally broken up at Woolwich in January 1817.

Pompey nickname
The Portsmouth nickname Pompey may have originated from HMS Pompee, which served as guard ship and prison hulk within Portsmouth Harbour. The northern England slang for prison is Pompey, possibly derived from criminals who may have served time aboard the prison ship Pompee. The ship's career as Portsmouth guard ship and prison hulk may have led to the ship becoming nationally associated with Portsmouth itself, although the ship's original French name becoming anglicised from Pompée to Pompey.

Notes, citations, and references
Notes

Citations

References
 Howard, Edward, Memoires of Admiral Sir Sidney Smith, K.C. B., & c., Volume 2, Adamant Media Corporation, 2003

Ships of the line of the Royal Navy
Ships of the line of the French Navy
Téméraire-class ships of the line
1791 ships
Captured ships
Ships built in France